Léon Fagel (1851–1913) was a French sculptor, best known for his busts.

Fagel was born in Valenciennes, won the second Prix de Rome in 1875, and the Prix de Rome in 1879. He exhibited busts of Chevreul, J. Cavelier, and Le Greffeur at the Exposition Universelle (1900), along with two large reliefs for Sacré-Cœur (Faith and Fortitude).

Selected works 
 Paris
 La Loi et La Justice, Cour des Comptes
 La Vierge des Marins, Sacré-Cœur
 Lettres, Sorbonne
 Michel Eugène Chevreul, Jardin des Plantes
 Jean-Baptiste Lamarck, Jardin des Plantes
 Sculpture, Place du Carrousel
 Silvestre, Comédie-Française
 Elsewhere
 Art, École Nationale Supérieure d'Arts et Métiers Centre de Lille, Lille
 Catherine Joséphine de Raffin, Musée des Beaux-Arts, Valenciennes
 Charles-François Daubigny, Auvers
 Joseph-François Dupleix, Landrecies
 Monument to the Battle of Wattignies (1793), Maubeuge

References 

 Daniel Cady Eaton, A Handbook of Modern French Sculpture, Dodd, Mead and Company, 1913, page 265.

External links 

 

1851 births
1913 deaths
Prix de Rome for sculpture
People from Valenciennes
20th-century French sculptors
19th-century French sculptors
French male sculptors
Officiers of the Légion d'honneur
19th-century French male artists